Andrew Johnson Jr. (November 8, 1932 – August 30, 2002) was an American professional basketball player.

A 6'5" guard/forward, Johnson played at the University of Portland in the 1950s before serving with the US military in the Korean War. He began his professional basketball career with the Harlem Globetrotters, then played in the NBA from 1958 to 1962 as a member of the Philadelphia Warriors and Chicago Packers. He averaged 9.8 points over his NBA career, posting a high of 14.3 points per game with the Packers in the 1961-62 season.

To Johnson's surprise, he was cut by Chicago before the 1962-63 season began, allegedly because he "didn't know the plays". He then joined the Philadelphia Tapers of the American Basketball League. Johnson hoped to return to the NBA after a season with the Tapers, but such an opportunity never materialized, and he played five more years in the Eastern Basketball Association. Because he had been cut by the Chicago Packers before his fifth NBA season, he did not qualify for a pension from the NBA, though after some effort, he managed to receive some money from them later in his life.

Johnson is the subject of a 2010 biography called Basketball Slave. The book was written by his son, Mark, who believed his father had been exploited throughout his athletic career on account of his ethnicity.

References

External links
NBA statistics

1932 births
2002 deaths
Allentown Jets players
American men's basketball players
Camden Bullets players
Chicago Packers expansion draft picks
Chicago Packers players
Harlem Globetrotters players
Philadelphia Warriors players
Portland Pilots men's basketball players
Undrafted National Basketball Association players
North Hollywood High School alumni
Basketball players from Los Angeles